The Battle of St. George's Caye was a military engagement that lasted from 3 to 10 September 1798, off the coast of British Honduras (present-day Belize). However, the name is typically reserved for the final battle that occurred on 10 September.

The Spaniards had previously attempted to expel the colonists on six occasions, most recently in 1779. 10 September 1798 marked the final Spanish attempt to take over the area. In Belize, the Battle of St. George's Caye is a national public and bank holiday.

Background 
The battle took place between an invading force from Mexico, attempting to assert Spanish claims to present-day Belize, and a small force of resident woodcutters called Baymen, who fought for their livelihood assisted by black slaves. After the final two and a half-hour battle, ravaged by sickness, the Spaniards withdrew.

The control of a territory including portions of what is now known as Belize was contested by Britain and Spain from as early as the mid-1750s.  Although never occupying the territory, Spain considered it part of its Central American territories, which then included portions of present-day Mexico and Guatemala. The British had entered the territory in 1638 to harvest logwood and, later, mahogany. Spain recognized this trade in the Treaty of Paris (signed in 1763) but did not end the dispute by ceding interest, delineating boundaries. From 1779 to 1782 the settlement was abandoned, Baymen and their African slaves relocating to Havana, Cuba following a Spanish attack.
The Spaniards in the 1500s made constant attempts to control the Yucatán coast that include Belize. In the mid-17th century some British sailors shipwrecked near the coast and they settled there. They were known as the Baymen and these buccaneer adventurers began to cut logwood in Belize and export them to Europe. The Spaniards never gave up claims on the Belize territory. They returned with 32 vessels, manned by 500 seamen and two thousand soldiers to affect the event. The battle started on 3 September 1798 and ended on 10 September. This is where the Baymen won the victory over the Spaniards. After this great defeat, the Spaniards never came back again to Belize.

Treaty of Versailles and the Superintendency 
In 1783, hostilities were temporarily halted with signing of the Treaty of Versailles, which conveyed the Baymen rights between the Belize and Hondo rivers; this was extended with the 1786 Convention of London to the Sibun River. Cutting rights were granted to the settlers on condition the settlement be recognized as belonging to Spain; Superintendent Col. Edward Marcus Despard was to administer the terms of the treaty – however, conflicts with inhabitants spurred Despard's resignation.

The Treaty of Versailles in 1783 affirmed the boundaries set by the Treaty of Paris to cut logwood and later extended by the Convention of London in 1786.
In this treaty, Spain gave permission to the British to cut mahogany and logwood from way down south to the Sibun River. It strongly forbade the British to settle any formal government during the agriculture work. Absolutely no economical activity more than cutting logwood. The Convention of London also specified that in return for the concessions Spain had made, the British were to give up all its other settlements in the region, notably the Mosquito Shore and the island of Roatan. As a result, the inhabitants of these areas had to be evacuated. The British brought them to Belize.

There was no longer war between Britain and Spain and they signed the peace Treaty of Versailles on 3 September 1783.

Ships
Captain John Moss, captain of the Merlin, believed that the Spaniards would wait to attack the following day, however, the attack ensued at 2:30 pm. The conflict launched approximately two hours and a half of action until the Spaniards abruptly cut their cables and departed towards Caye Chapel. The Merlin was unable to chase after them due to the shallow waters.

Prelude 
Humphreys relates that in a 1796 visit to the area, Visitador Juan O'Sullivan claimed the British were encroaching on Spanish territory in Mexico by cutting near the Hondo. Upon his return to Spain, hostilities broke out between Great Britain and Spain as a result of the Napoleonic Wars. The Spanish viewed the situation seriously and determined to remove the British.

Colonists appealed to Jamaican Lieutenant Governor Alexander Lindsay, 6th Earl of Balcarres, for assistance. Even though he was in the midst of the Maroon Wars, Balcarres nonetheless sent muskets and ammunition to the settlement and a further shipment arrived on Commander Thomas Dundas' ship  in December 1796. But upon his arrival, Dundas noted panic in the settlement and the subsequent dispatching of slaves to cut logwood instead of preparing to defend the settlement.

Balcarres then named Major (promoted to Lieutenant Colonel) Thomas Barrow Superintendent of the settlement. Barrow, a seasoned veteran of war according to Humphreys, immediately began whipping the unruly Baymen into shape, and martial law, stopping all activities in the settlement, was declared on 11 February 1797. On 18 March, magistrates Thomas Potts, Thomas Graham and Marshall Bennett all asked Barrow whether there were any incoming messages from Jamaica. Barrow assured that more help would be on the way soon, to alleviate the fears of the Baymen, but Humphreys calls the actions of Potts and company "cowardly" and says that even after that reassurance morale was low.

June evacuation meeting 
Impatient with the plans to defend the settlement, the Baymen called a public meeting for 1 June 1797. At this meeting, the Baymen voted 65 to 51 to defend the settlement and cooperate with Barrow. This initial support wavered considerably between then and September 1798, as reports came in of the size of the Spanish fleet. Don Arturo O'Neill Tirone, Yucatán Governor and Commander of the expedition, had secured:

This estimate was severely reduced due to outbreaks of yellow fever and dissent in the Spanish army. Nevertheless, it was enough to frighten the Baymen into posting lookouts near the boundaries of the territory.

Baymen's preparations 
's captain in 1798 was John Moss, a strategist on the order of Barrow. By 18 July the fleet had reached Cozumel, leading the settlers to agree to arm their slaves, an act that affected the outcome of the battle due to the slaves' knowledge of warfare. There were still some who were cautious and demanded evacuation, including Potts, but Balcarres ignored them and imposed martial law on 26 July. The Settlement lineup consisted of the following:

Except for the crews of Towser and Tickler, the rest of the crews consisted of 354 volunteers from the "Colonial Troops". In addition there were 700 troops ready to deter attack by land.

Battle 
From 3 to 5 September, the Spaniards tried to force their way through Montego Caye shoal, blocked by the defenders. The military commanders, Moss and Barrow, differed on where to put their resources for the next phase of the fight: Barrow thought they would go to the land phase, while Moss decided on defending St. George's Caye. Moss arrived in time to stop the Spaniards, setting the stage for 10 September.

At 1:00 p.m. that afternoon, the Spaniards and British lined up off St. George's Caye. The Spaniards stormed through the channel, and at 1:30 engaged the British in a two-hour fight which ended in defeat for the confused Spaniards. Moss reported no one killed and the Baymen in good spirits. Barrow was dispatched and arrived in time to see the end of the battle and prevent the slave men from boarding the enemy. The Spaniards were in full retreat by 13 September, and Barrow agreed to send vessels to further push the Spaniards back.

Commemoration 
On the 100th anniversary of the battle, the colonial government declared 9 and 10 September a national holiday. It was organized by a Centennial Committee as part of an ethnic and middle-class narrative by Creoles in Belize Town to assert their status as natives and equal partners to the whites in the colony of British Honduras, now Belize.

The chief advocates in the committee were Henry Charles Usher, Wilfred A. Haylock, Benjamin Fairweather, and Absalom Hyde. They held that the Battle represented the heroic contribution of the Baymen and slaves to the colony. In their speeches, they said that had it not been for the Baymen and slaves fighting "shoulder to shoulder" British Honduras would have ended up being a settlement like Cuba or the Philippines. They argued that while the slaves could have escaped, they stayed and defended the settlement.

The Centennial celebrations has been interpreted a means through which the middle-class Creoles sought to gain recognition in the society as "true patriots."

Today, the event is celebrated as St. George's Caye Day on 10 September. It is considered a national and historic event to recognize the efforts of the Baymen and slaves, as ancestors of Belize. In 1998 Belize issued three coins to commemorate the 200th anniversary of the battle. These consisted of a cupro-nickel $2, a 0.925 silver $10 and a 0.917 gold $100. The obverse features a three-masted sailing vessel from the national coat-of-arms. The reverse features HMS Merlin and two of the oar-powered flat boats.

See also 
 Knocking Our Own Ting

Notes

Sources
 Cain, Ernest. "The life story of Simon Lamb". Excerpt from an unpublished manuscript. Retrieved from: 
 Defence of the Settlers of Honduras Against the Unjust and Unfounded Representations of Col. George Arthur, Late Superintendent of the Settlement (London: A. J. Valpy,1823). Retrieved from: 
 Humphreys, H.F. "Gallant Spirits: The Battle of St. George's Caye." In Readings in Belizean History III.
 Lamb, Simon. Biography by National Heritage Library:  and 
 "Imagining the Colonial Nation: Race, Gender, and Middle-Class Politics in Belize, 1888–1898". In Race and Nation in Modern Latin America, edited by Nancy Appelbaum, Anne S. Macpherson, and Karin Alejandra Rosemblatt, 108–31. Chapel Hill: University of North Carolina Press, 2003
 Judd, Karen. (1989). "White Man, Black Man, Baymen, Creole Racial Harmony and Ethnic Identity in Belize". Paper presented at the 15th International Congress, Latin American Studies Association, San Juan, Puerto Rico. Retrieved from: 
 Metzgen, Monrad Sigfrid (ed.), 1928, Shoulder to Shoulder or The Battle of Saint George's Caye
 Macpherson, Anne S. (2007). From Colony to Nation: Women Activists and the Gendering of Politics in Belize, 1912–1982. USA: University of Nebraska.
 Ramos, Adele. "Founder of the 10th celebrations, Simon lamb, remembered". In Amandala: 
 Shoman, Assad. (1994, Revised 2000). Thirteen chapters of a history of Belize. Belize: Angelus Press.
 Vernon, L. (1994) I Love to Tell The Story. Heritage Printers, Belize City. Available online:

External links
 Dobson, N. (1979). A History of Belize. Trinidad and Jamaica: Longman Caribbean.
 The Battle of St Georges Caye

Conflicts in 1798
18th century in Belize
St George's Caye
St George's Caye
St George's Caye
Remembrance days
1798 in Central America
18th century in Central America
1798 in the Caribbean
1798 in the Spanish Empire
1798 in the British Empire